The Bluff Dale Sandstone is a geological formation in Texas whose strata date back to the Early Cretaceous. Dinosaur remains are among the fossils that have been recovered from the formation.

Vertebrate paleofauna
 Titanosauriformes indet. (previously assigned to Pleurocoelus)

See also

 List of dinosaur-bearing rock formations

References

Lower Cretaceous Series of North America
Aptian Stage